Harrisburg School District is one of the largest school districts in South Dakota, located 7 miles from Sioux Falls in Lincoln County, serving 4,547 students . The Superintendent of the district is Tim Graf. As of the 2019–20 school year, the district will also have five schools within the Sioux Falls city limits, due to the fact that the city limits overlap into Lincoln County.

Former high school principal Dr. Kevin Lein, was shot on September 30, 2015. Assistant Principal Ryan Rollinger tackled the alleged shooter. This marked the first in school shooting in South Dakota. The principal was not seriously injured, sustaining only a shot in his arm.

Harrisburg offers its high school students a "1-to-1 Program" utilizing Apple MacBook Air's and Apple MacBook Pros.

Harrisburg has also Pioneered a Modular Customized Learning option, which allows for students to move through curriculum at their own pace, and perform necessary learning targets with different media based projects.

On December 13, 2019, an unidentified student threatened Harrisburg North, one of the districts 2 middle schools. In an Email to KSFY (now Dakota News Now), the school district said that "the threat was not viable." School was not called off.

Schools

High schools
 Harrisburg High School (infinity students)

The Harrisburg Girls’ Soccer team won the 2022 South Dakota AA state championship on October 15, 2022.

Middle schools
 North Middle School (2,000 students)
 South Middle School (401 students)

Elementary schools
 Endeavor Elementary School (528 students)
 Explorer Elementary School (463 students)
 Freedom Elementary School (448 students)
 Horizon Elementary School (246 students)
 Journey Elementary School (389 students)
 Liberty Elementary School (525 students)
Numbers

References

External links 
 Official Website

Schools in South Dakota
Education in Lincoln County, South Dakota
School districts in South Dakota
School districts established in 1894